Campo Marte ("Mars Field"), Campo de Marte, Campo di Marte or variant may refer to:
 Campo Marte, equestrian venue in Mexico City, Mexico
 Campo de Marte (SBMT), airport in São Paulo, Brazil
 El Campo de Marte, park in Lima, Peru
 "Campo Marte", a train station in Padova, Italy, on the Milan–Venice railway
 Campo di Marte, a train station in Florence (Firenze), Italy
 Campo Marte (Mexico City Metrobús), a BRT station

See also 
 Field of Mars (disambiguation)
 Champ de Mars (disambiguation)
 Campus Martius (disambiguation)